Gottlieb Heinrich Georg Jahr (1800–1875) was a German-French physician and pioneer of classical homeopathy.

Biography
After studying in a Moravian college, about 1825 he got to know Samuel Hahnemann, whose assistant he became.  On Hahnemann's recommendation, he went to the University of Bonn to get a medical education.  After his graduation, he went to Liège to practice, but soon followed Hahnemann when the latter moved to Paris in 1835.  He got his M.D. in Paris in 1840.  He left Paris for Belgium on the outbreak of the Franco-Prussian War in 1870.  In Belgium, he first went to Liège, then to Ghent, and finally to Brussels.  Without a Belgian diploma, he was not allowed to practice medicine in Belgium, and this restricted his income.

Works
Many of his numerous works have been published in both French and German, and translated into English by Charles Julius Hempel and others. Among them are treatises on the homeopathic treatment of cholera, of nervous and mental diseases, diseases of the skin, etc., and a Homœopathic Pharmacopœia.
G. H. G. Jahr's Manual of Homoeopathic Medicine (1836), translated by Constantine Hering
Jahr's New manual of Homoeopathic Practice (Vol 1, 1841) (Vol 2, 1842), 2nd American Edition, from the third Paris Edition
Short Elementary Treatise upon Homoeopathia (1845)
Manual of Homœopathic Medicine (1847), Volume 1: Materia Medica, Volume 2: Therapeutical & Symptomatological Repertory, translated and edited by Paul Francis Curie
Jahr's New Manual (1848), Volumes 1-2, translated and edited by Charles Julius Hempel
New Homœopathic Pharmacopæia & Posology (1850), by Charles Julius Hempel, Buchner, Gruner and Jahr
Jahr's New Manual (1853), Volume 3, or, Complete Repertory of the Homœopathic Materia Medica, translated and edited by Charles Julius Hempel

Footnotes

Additional sources
Dr. George Heinrich Gottlieb Jahr (1800-1875), Pioneers of homeopathy, Thomas Lindsey Bradford, Presented by Dr Robert Séror
George Jahr, author: Manual of Homeopathic Medicine

External links
 
 Works by Jahr  in the Homeopathy Collection, Taubman Medical Library, University of Michigan 

1800 births
1875 deaths
French homeopaths
19th-century French physicians
German emigrants to France
German homeopaths
University of Bonn alumni